Oziel is a given name. Notable people with the name include:

Oziel França da Silva (born 1984), Brazilian football player
Oziel Hlalele Motaung, member of the Pan-African Parliament from Lesotho